Indaba remixes from Wonderland is the fifth release of the alternative rock band Marcy Playground. It was released on September 28, 2010.  Fans and musicians from all around the world had submitted some 337 individual remixes to Indaba Music in support of the album.  "Marcy Playground" were extremely impressed by the various musical directions and vast musical genres fans and fellow musicians went with the music.

Track listing

Personnel

Marcy Playground

John Wozniak - lead vocals, guitar, songwriter, producer
Dylan Keefe - bass, backing vocals
Shlomi Lavie - drums, backing vocals

References

External links
Official Myspace Page
Official Website
Official Facebook

Marcy Playground albums
2010 remix albums
Capitol Records remix albums
EMI Records remix albums